
Gmina Dziwnów is an urban-rural gmina (administrative district) in Kamień County, West Pomeranian Voivodeship, in north-western Poland.

Villages
Apart from the town of Dziwnów, the gmina also contains the villages of Dziwnówek, Łukęcin and Międzywodzie.

Neighbouring gminas
Gmina Dziwnów is bordered by the gminas of Kamień Pomorski, Rewal, Świerzno and Wolin.

References
Polish official population figures 2006

Dziwnow
Kamień County